The Caracal pistol is a series of semi-automatic pistols manufactured by Caracal International LLC a subsidiary of Tawazun Holding from the United Arab Emirates. The Caracal pistol series are the first pistols made in the United Arab Emirates and is the primary service issued pistol used by the United Arab Emirates Armed Forces.

Development
Starting in 2002, a team of European weapons designers and experts working in conjunction with the United Arab Emirates Armed Forces started the development of a range of modern pistols and accessories. The research and development team was led by the Austrian firearms designer Wilhelm Bubits who previously had designed the Steyr M pistol.

Before being put into production the Caracal pistol was evaluated through independent tests.
These tests were carried out by the Federal German Armed Forces Technical Center for Weapons and Ammunition (WTD 91) in Meppen, Germany which included metallurgic and composite analysis, functional fitness-for-purpose and quality evaluation, endurance firing, environmental exposure, safety and accuracy tests.
A certificate was issued  by the Bundeswehr Technical Center for Weapons and Ammunition (WTD 91) in May 2006 after the pistol successfully complied with the NATO D14 standard, the German Federal Police Standard and the German Federal Armed Forces Technical Purchasing requirements. These tests are the most stringent test protocols ever devised for a service firearm.

Small numbers of pre-production pistols were made in Suhl, Germany by Merkel. These pistols were given to a limited number of testers who were instructed to shoot them as much as possible to test for reliability and defects.

By the end of 2006, Caracal International L.L.C. was incorporated and registered as a company in Abu Dhabi. With that, the foundation of a pistol manufacturing industry was established for the first time in the GCC.

The pistols were unveiled at the International Defence Exhibition, IDEX 2007 in Abu Dhabi.

In February 2007 25,000 Caracal F pistols in 9 mm were ordered by various armies and security forces of the Gulf Cooperation Council countries.
The Caracal pistol is now the new service pistol of the United Arab Emirates, Bahrain and Jordan as of April, 2008.
The United Arab Emirates and Algeria established on November, 17th, 2008 a joint committee in order to test the Caracal pistol for further adoption by Algeria.
The Caracal pistols were originally slated to be introduced into the European market and made available to Austrian customers in early 2009; this was rectified at the IDEX 2009 exhibition, when Caracal announced that an export line to Italy was to be started with "the first samples delivered immediately after the IDEX". The Caracal pistols have been introduced on the Italian civilian/sport shooters market during the 2009 EXA expo (Brescia, 18–21 April 2009), and are being imported by the Italian arms company Fratelli Tanfoglio S.N.C.

On 15 January 2009 Caracal received an export licence from the United States, which will enable it to ship its products to the United States. According to Caracal's commercial director Saeed Ali Al Shamsi, the Bureau of Alcohol, Tobacco, Firearms and Explosives gave its approval for sales in the United States in May 2009 and the company plans to embark on a soft launch of the firearms in America in 2010 with the handguns selling for up to US$720 (AED 2,650) in North America.

Besides the NATO and many other militaries standard 9×19mm Parabellum chambering, the manufacturer will offer this pistol also in the 9×21mm, .357 SIG and .40 Smith & Wesson chamberings. At the IDEX 2009, the company announced that work is being carried on to manufacture the Caracal pistols in .45 ACP, and that an SCHV (small-caliber/high-velocity) ammunition, along the lines of 5.7×28mm and 4.6×30mm, is also under study for military customers.

In October 2013 the original Caracal pistol line was delisted by the manufacturer. The original model line was replaced by the CP660, CP661 and CP662 models that are very similar to the original Caracal F, C and SC pistol models, but feature redesigned slides. In 2015 the CP660, CP661 and CP662 models were delisted and the Caracal F and C were listed again. The new Carcal F and C models have two pins through the trigger mechanism, where the recalled models featured only one pin.

At the 2016 SHOT Show Caracal and Wilcox Industries announced a new strategic partnership that would see Caracal firearms produced for the first time in the United States from Wilcox’s world-class manufacturing facility in Newington, New Hampshire.

At the 2017 SHOT Show Caracal USA showcased the U.S. manufactured Enhanced F pistol, with new features such as an after a recall redesigned safety system made up of an integrated trigger safety, firing pin safety and drop safety, serrations on the forward end of the slide and dovetailed sights. MSRP for the Enhanced F is USD 599. Projected consumer availability is targeted for mid-March 2017. The Enhanced F variant weighs  more than the original F pistol. The Enhanced F variant can be ordered with a coyote brown or olive drab grip frame, a threaded barrel for mounting a silencer and can mount aiming optics on its slide.

Demonstrations

Italy
On 9 October 2009, a briefing and shooting tests event has been held by Caracal International and Tanfoglio at the Futura Club shooting range, close to Rome, for representatives of the Italian military and law enforcement communities.

Participants from the Italian police and military forces included members of:
 the Nucleo Operativo Centrale di Sicurezza
 the Gruppo di Intervento Speciale
 the 17º Stormo Incursori of the Italian air force
 the 9th Parachute Assault Regiment of the Italian army
 Polizia Penitenziaria
 Guardia di Finanza
 Corps of Gendarmerie of Vatican City
 U.S. State Department from the United States Embassy in Rome

Thailand
During Defence & Security 2009 (4–5 November 2009) in Thailand, a demonstration has been held on a local range where members of the armed forces, law enforcement and International Practical Shooting Confederation shooters have tested and evaluated the different models.

France
On 18 and 19 November 2009 a demonstration has been held during the Milipol 2009 exhibition in Paris. A group of representatives from the French police and their tactical units, Swiss police, German police, NATO forces and EU diplomatic security agents attended a briefing and presentation of the Caracal line of products.

Caracal made 40 pistols and an unlimited supply of ammunition available to members of the specialized press and French law enforcement community members for testing on a nearby shooting range in Issy-les-Moulineaux.

United States
Caracal USA is a subsidiary of Caracal International and the exclusive importer and manufacturer of Caracal products in the United States. Caracal products were formerly imported by Waffen Werks in Knoxville, Tennessee and Steyr Arms, Trussville, Alabama.

Design details

Features
The Caracal is a fully ambidextrous polymer framed pistol that features an ergonomically designed grip with a rounded butt and a grip angle of 111°. The lower forward edge of the frame has a mounting-bracket or rail interface system for mounting accessories.
The pistol's low slide profile design holds the pistol barrel axis close to the shooter's hand and makes the pistols more comfortable to shoot by reducing muzzle rise and allows faster aim recovery in rapid shooting sequence. This low bore axis principle is also found in the Glock, Steyr M and in the later developed Arsenal Firearms Strike One pistols.

The metal slide guide rails are designed to be as long as possible to promote stability, by reducing torsion and flexing of the grip frame, during firing and a close fit between the slide and grip frame for plenty direct mechanical interaction between the slide and grip frame. Furthermore, the rails being part of the frame sub assembly that bears all internals, it is easier to assemble the mechanism for manufacturing or disassemble for maintenance and replacement.

The pistols have a fully supported chamber and fixed iron sights featuring straight- straight-eight pattern contrast enhancements of which the front element can be adjusted for windage. The unadjustable rear sight element is an integral part of the firing pin unit and can only be changed by exchanging the entire firing pin unit. The Enhanced F pistol introduced in 2017 features a none-integral dovetailed rear sight element. The pistols can be supplied with grip inserts in several distinctive colours (black, gray, green, blue and orange) that can be used for identification purposes. The grip size can not be adjusted with these grip inserts.

The metal parts receive a proprietary "Plasox" plasma-based nitriding with an enclosed post-oxidizing surface treatment producing a protective coating resistant to aggressive environmental conditions. The manufacturer claims that this proprietary protective layer method is relatively environmental friendly, is very durable and protects well against rust.
The metal parts of the U.S. produced Enhanced F receive a QPQ salt bath nitriding process.

There are however also two-tone Caracal pistols available with bright metal slides that did not receive the "Plasox" plasma-based nitriding surface treatment.

According to the manufacturer the 28 parts and components these pistols are made of are interchangeable for easy production and maintenance. A take-down lever allows the pistol to be disassembled without tools by the user.

The pistol is supplied with two box magazines and a user manual, packed in a plastic carry case.

Operating mechanism
The Caracal is a striker fired semi-automatic pistol, meaning the trigger system is of the hammerless short double-action-only type.
A cocking indicator below the rear sight indicates visibly and tactilely if the pistol is cocked and ready to fire.

Safety
The pistol features a triple safety system that secures the weapon against accidental discharge and consists of three independent safety mechanisms: an external integrated trigger safety and two automatic internal safeties – a firing pin safety and a drop safety.

The pistol has a loaded chamber indicator in the form of a witness opening at the rear of the chamber that allows the user to see from the top side of the slide if a cartridge is present in the chamber.

Ammunition feeding
The double-column type box magazine is released by an ambidextrous magazine release.

Accessories
Available factory accessories include a rigid shoulder stock, a tactical front grip which can be fitted to the optical mounting-bracket on the lower forward edge of the frame, a key-locking system to provide additional gun security when the pistol is not in use, a fibre glass front-sight insert, "gutter pattern" quick sights, self-luminous tritium powered low light sights, magazine loader and optical aiming sight mounting bracket.

A custom-made modular holster has been designed by Sandro Amadini. Ghost International modular system holster's unique  patented retention system GSS (Ghost Safety System) has been adapted to Caracal pistols. The innovative Ghost modular system with its various base plates allowing high ride, medium ride, tactical ride carry as well as concealed carry enhances and complements Caracal pistols qualities.

Variants

The pistol is available in several variants:

 Caracal F - Basic, full-size variant; original design
 Caracal C - Compact (reduced length and height) variant of the Caracal F
 Caracal SC - Subcompact pistol marketed as a primary weapon for government professionals who must conceal a handgun for job related situations, or as a secondary back up pistol; no longer available in 2015
 Caracal Enhanced F - Basic, full-size variant; replaced the Caracal F, upgraded safety system and other new features

A version of the Caracal adapted to high velocity ammunition like the 4.6×30mm used in the Heckler & Koch MP7 and the 5.7×28mm used in the FN P90 and the FN Five-Seven would be under development. This could be linked to the desire for a neighbouring country to adopt either the H&K MP7 or the FN P90 personal defense weapon.

Recall
On Sept. 9th, 2013 a recall was issued for all model C pistols made by Caracal stating:

Caracal is now issuing this recall of all Model C pistols in all markets, following the completion of a full investigation. Caracal is initiating this voluntary recall of Model C pistols because the safety of its customers is paramount. 

This recall affects all Model C pistols, including but not limited to those with serial numbers which start with the following letters: HM, AA, AD, AG, CA, CB, CC, CD, CE, CF, CG, CH, CI, CJ, CK, CL, CM, CN, CP, CR and CS.

If you own or have access to a Caracal Model C pistol, PLEASE DO NOT LOAD OR FIRE YOUR PISTOL. Please contact Caracal customer care immediately to arrange to have your Model C pistol returned. Caracal will provide you with a full refund of the purchase price of your Caracal Model C pistol or vouchers for other Caracal products. Unfortunately, the potential safety issues cannot be addressed through a repair of the Model C pistol and all Model C pistols must be returned for refund.

In October 2016 Caracal USA announced that they will replace the recalled pistols with a Model F pistol upgraded with a redesigned trigger safety, trigger bar, firing pin unit.

Users

 Jordanian Armed Forces
 Jordanian police units
: Libyan National Army
 
 United Arab Emirates Armed Forces
 Abu Dhabi Police Force
 Dubai Police Force

Gallery

See also
CAR 816

References

External links 

Caracal International LLC.
Caracal Consulting Pictures, videos, information

.357 SIG semi-automatic pistols
.40 S&W semi-automatic pistols
9mm Parabellum semi-automatic pistols
9×21mm IMI semi-automatic pistols
Police weapons
Weapons of the United Arab Emirates
Emirati inventions